Koen De Graeve (born 28 April 1972) is a Belgian actor. He appeared in more than forty films since 1993.

Selected filmography

References

External links 

1972 births
Living people
Belgian male film actors